Doster is a surname. Notable people with the surname include:

David Doster (born 1970), American baseball player
Frank Doster (1847–1933), American judge
Merav Doster (born 1976), Israeli screenwriter
Reggie Doster (born 1976), American football player

See also
Docter (surname)